Cyclofenil, sold under the brand name Sexovid among others, is a selective estrogen receptor modulator (SERM) medication which is used as a gonadotropin stimulant or ovulation inducer and in menopausal hormone therapy in women. It is mostly no longer available. The medication is taken by mouth.

Side effects of cyclofenil include liver toxicity among others. It is a selective estrogen receptor modulator (SERM) and hence is a mixed agonist–antagonist of the estrogen receptor (ER), the biological target of estrogens like estradiol. It has antiestrogenic effects on the hypothalamic–pituitary–gonadal axis and hence can increase sex hormone production and stimulate ovulation.

Cyclofenil was introduced for medical use in 1970. It has been mostly discontinued, but remains available in a few countries, including Brazil, Italy, and Japan. It has been used as a doping agent by male athletes.

Medical use
Cyclofenil is used to treat menstrual disturbances and anovulatory infertility caused by insufficiency of the hypothalamic–pituitary–gonadal axis in women. It has also been used to treat menopausal symptoms. The medication is generally used at a dosage of 400 to 600 mg per day.

Available forms
Cyclofenil has been available in the form of 100, 200, and 400 mg oral tablets.

Non-medical use
Cyclofenil has been used by male athletes to increase testosterone levels. It is not effective for this purpose in women.

Contraindications
Cyclofenil is contraindicated during pregnancy and in those with severe liver disease and unexplained uterine bleeding.

Side effects
Cyclofenil is associated with a relatively high incidence of hepatotoxicity. Biochemical signs of undesirable liver changes have been observed in 35% or more of individuals and 1% of individuals experience overt hepatitis.

Pharmacology

Pharmacodynamics
Cyclofenil is a SERM, or a mixed agonist and antagonist of the estrogen receptors (ERs). It is described as a relatively weak/mild SERM. The medication is generally less effective than other SERMs. The medication is an "impeded estrogen" and is thought to work as a progonadotropin by blocking the actions of estrogens in the pituitary gland and hypothalamus, thereby disinhibiting release of the gonadotropins luteinizing hormone and follicle-stimulating hormone. In men, cyclofenil can increase testosterone levels due its progonadotropic effects.

Pharmacokinetics
In terms of distribution, cyclofenil acts both centrally and peripherally. The elimination half-life of cyclofenil after a single 200 mg dose is 18 to 29 hours.

Chemistry
Cyclofenil is a nonsteroidal SERM and is closely related structurally to triphenylethylene SERMs like clomifene and tamoxifen. It has been referred to as a diphenylethylene derivative, differing from triphenylethylenes only by the replacement of one of the phenyl rings with a cyclohexane ring.

History
Cyclofenil was first introduced for medical use in 1970 under the brand name Ondogyne in France. Subsequently, it was introduced throughout the world under a variety of other brand names, including its most well-known brand name Sexovid.

Society and culture

Generic names

Brand names
Cyclofenil has been marketed under a variety of brand names including Ciclifen, Fertodur, Gyneuro, Klofenil, Menoferil, Menopax, Neoclym, Oginex, Ondonid, Ondogyne, Rehibin, Sexadieno, Sexovar, and Sexovid.

Availability
Cyclofenil remains available today only in Brazil, Italy, and Japan. In the past, it has also been available in France, Germany, Mexico, Sweden, Switzerland, Turkey, and the United Kingdom.

Regulation
Cyclofenil is included on the World Anti-Doping Agency list of illegal doping agents in sport.

Research
Cyclofenil was investigated as a possible treatment for scleroderma in the 1980s, but was found to be ineffective. Later study of its efficacy in treating Raynaud's phenomenon in people with scleroderma also found no significant benefit.

References

Acetate esters
Hepatotoxins
Progonadotropins
Selective estrogen receptor modulators
World Anti-Doping Agency prohibited substances
Bis(4-hydroxyphenyl)methanes